The 1992 WLAF season was the second season of the World League of American Football (WLAF). The regular season began on March 21, and concluded on May 24. The postseason ran from May 30 until June 6, when the Sacramento Surge defeated the Orlando Thunder 21–17 in World Bowl '92 at Olympic Stadium in Montreal, Quebec, Canada.

Regular season

Week 1

Week 2

Week 3

Week 4

Week 5

Week 6

Week 7

Week 8

Week 9

Week 10

Standings

Postseason

References

NFL Europe (WLAF) seasons
WLAF season